Matt Carroll (born February 16, 1986) is a former professional lacrosse player for the Toronto Rock of the National Lacrosse League.

References

1986 births
Living people
Canadian lacrosse players
Lacrosse people from Ontario
People from Ajax, Ontario